The Empress Hotel (formerly the Empress of India Hotel) is a pub located at 714 Nicholson Street, in the inner Melbourne suburb of Fitzroy North. The Empress Hotel closed in December 2013, and reopened in its current form in early 2015.

History
The pub was opened in 1873 by John Bourke, and named in honour of Queen Victoria, who had been proclaimed the Empress of India on 1 January 1877. Until the late 20th century, it was frequented by employees of the nearby North Fitzroy tram depot.

In the late 1980s, it became a live music venue, and played a part in the Melbourne indie rock scene through the 90s and 2000s. In its last decade as a music venue, hotel management had to deal with noise complaints from residents who had moved nearby without realising it was a music venue. In February 2015 the venue reopened with a traditional bar, a dining area and an open air beer garden.

See also
List of public houses in Australia

References

External links 

Hotel buildings completed in 1873
Music venues in Melbourne
Pubs in Melbourne
1873 establishments in Australia
Fitzroy, Victoria
Buildings and structures in the City of Yarra